This is a list of the games played by the Croatia women's national football team since Croatia gained independence from Yugoslavia in 1990.

List of Croatia games

See also
Croatia women's national football team
List of Croatia women's international footballers
Croatian Football Federation

External links
List of matches at Croatian Football Federation website

women's national football team results
Women's national association football team results
Results